Andrus Merilo (born 2 June 1973) is an Estonian military commander.

In 2005 he was the commander of ESTPLA-10 in Iraq. In 2007 he was the commander of ESTCOY-4 in Afghanistan.

Since 2013 he is the commander of Scouts Battalion.

In 2006 he was awarded with Order of the Cross of the Eagle, V class.

References

Living people
1973 births
Estonian military personnel
Estonian military personnel of the War in Afghanistan (2001–2021)